"Don't Box Me In" is a collaboration between the Police drummer Stewart Copeland and former Wall of Voodoo vocalist Stan Ridgway, recorded as part of the soundtrack for the Francis Ford Coppola movie Rumble Fish and subsequently released as a single. Copeland plays guitar, drums, bass and keyboards, and Ridgway sings and plays harmonica. A music video for the song directed by Howard Deutch, where footage from Rumble Fish is interspersed with black and white images of Ridgway and Copeland in the studio, received significant airplay on MTV. The song peaked at #91 in the UK singles chart in 1983.

Chart positions

References

1983 songs
1983 singles
Songs written by Stewart Copeland
Songs written by Stan Ridgway
Stan Ridgway songs
A&M Records singles